Cyrtodactylus serratus is a species of gecko that is endemic to Papua New Guinea, specifically the south-west part of the country. It is a rather common species, living mostly in the canopy of forests. It is found in elevations of 100 meters to 1,400 meters.

References 

Cyrtodactylus
Reptiles described in 2007